Branchinella lithaca, the Stone Mountain fairy shrimp, is a species of crustacean in the family Thamnocephalidae. It was collected on Stone Mountain, De Kalb County, Georgia in 1940, and has not been seen since. It is listed as Critically Endangered on the IUCN Red List.

References

Branchiopoda
Freshwater crustaceans of North America
Fauna of the Southeastern United States
Endemic fauna of the United States
Natural history of Georgia (U.S. state)
DeKalb County, Georgia
Crustaceans described in 1940
Taxonomy articles created by Polbot